Adeline Jay Geo-Karis (March 29, 1918 – February 10, 2008) was a Republican politician and a member of the Illinois Senate for the 31st District, where she served for over 25 years. Prior to her election as Senator, she was in the Illinois House of Representatives from 1973 to 1979. Known simply as "Geo" to her constituents, she was a popular politician in Lake County, Illinois for many years. Known for her no-nonsense attitude and her ability to work across party lines, she also served for a time as Mayor of Zion.

Life
Born in Greece, Geo-Karis came to America at the age of four with her parents. She attended Northwestern University and the DePaul University College of Law. She rose to the rank Lt. Commander in the United States Naval Reserves before retiring with a top secret security clearance. She also served as a Justice of the Peace and later as an assistant state's attorney in Lake County.

Due to an inter-party feud which included Republican Susan Simpson challenging Geo-Karis after she had told her she wanted to stay on for one more term, Geo-Karis endorsed Democrat Michael Bond to replace her. Bond's election, in a historically Republican district, was one of the many Democratic victories in 2006 that gave the Democratic Party a super-majority in the State Senate. Geo-Karis finished her final term in the 94th General Assembly where she served as the Executive Appointments Co-Chairperson. She also served on the Senate Committee of the Whole and the Pensions & Investments committees. Geo-Karis was also an avid supporter of Saint Demitrios Greek Orthodox Church, and was a member there for over fifty years.

Death and legacy
She died on February 10, 2008, aged 89, of natural causes, at Glenbrook Hospital in Glenview, Illinois. The Adeline Jay Geo-Karis Illinois Beach State Park in Zion is named for her.

References

External links

1918 births
2008 deaths
Women mayors of places in Illinois
Greek emigrants to the United States
Republican Party members of the Illinois House of Representatives
Republican Party Illinois state senators
Mayors of places in Illinois
DePaul University College of Law alumni
Northwestern University alumni
Illinois lawyers
Female United States Navy officers
Military personnel from Illinois
Women state legislators in Illinois
People from Glenview, Illinois
People from Zion, Illinois
20th-century American politicians
20th-century American women politicians
20th-century American lawyers
United States Navy reservists
21st-century American women